Rugby league is a comparatively minor sport in Scotland, dwarfed by the popularity of association football and rugby union, and to a lesser extent curling, ice hockey and shinty. With the introduction of rugby league into a small number schools and the formation of youth rugby league in Scotland it has seen juniors being signed to Super League clubs.

History
In 1895, there was a schism within the game of rugby in neighbouring England which saw the sport of rugby divided. Rugby union remained amateur and rugby league permitted payments to players. However, no such split took place in Scotland where the clubs continued to play rugby union. 14 Scottish players would cross over and play rugby league in England before amateurism was abandoned.

The history of rugby league in Scotland goes back to 1909 when the touring Australian team drew 17–17 with a Northern Rugby Football Union representative side at Celtic Park, Glasgow. A further match against the Australians followed at Tynecastle, Edinburgh in 1911, again an 11–11 tie. After this the Rugby Football League largely gave up on  expansion north of the border.

Nonetheless, a number of Scottish rugby union players, particularly from the Border region, moved south to play for English clubs. The numbers were not nearly so great as with Welsh players (see Rugby league in Wales), and a Scottish national team was never seriously considered, though Scots did feature for Other Nationalities and were eligible for Great Britain.

Probably the most famous figure in Scottish rugby league during this period was Dave Valentine, who captained Great Britain to World Cup victory in 1954.

In 1989, a Scotland students side was formed at the University of Aberdeen, and this proved to be the catalyst for the formation of a number of other clubs. The national team first played in 1995, and a domestic league followed in 1997.

In 2000 and 2002 the Rugby League Challenge Cup Final was held at Murrayfield in Edinburgh, the home of the Scottish Rugby Union. In 2000 Bradford Bulls defeated Leeds Rhinos 24–18, and in 2002 Wigan Warriors beat St. Helens 21–12. Both ties were played in front of over 60,000 spectators, by far the biggest rugby league events ever held in Scotland.

Governing body
Scotland Rugby League is the governing body for rugby league in Scotland overseeing development and participation at all levels of the sport.

Competitions

Senior
The Scottish National League is the highest tier exclusively Scottish rugby league competition and comprises four teams: Aberdeen Warriors, Ayrshire Storm, Easterhouse Panthers, and Edinburgh Eagles. The league is governed by Scotland Rugby League, despite this it listed as a BARLA fifth tier regional league in the British rugby league system. This allows for promotion and relegation between the different levels however there is no direct transfer and any promotion to higher levels of the pyramid is done by application to the Rugby Football League who operate the top three professional levels of the British system. Currently, no Scottish sides have played in the higher tiers of the pyramid.

Junior
The Saltire Schools Cup is a nationwide Scottish schools competition for boys and girls from S1–S4 school age groups. The National Youth League is competed for at under-17 and under-15 level.

National team

There are two Scottish teams selected: Scotland and Scotland A. The Scotland team is predominantly second-generation professional players, born and bred in England, whereas the Scotland A team (nicknamed "the Bravehearts") is selected from the domestic Scottish competition.

Scotland has participated in the Emerging Nations Cup (1995), in every World Cup since 2000, and European Nations Cup (since 2003) competitions.

Since 2002, Scotland A has participated in the Amateur Four Nations competition and toured Italy, the Netherlands, and Serbia.

Popularity

Rugby league is a contracting sport in Scotland largely caused by the reduction in funding from the RFL, attracting stagnating interest. In addition to the four clubs in the Scottish National League, there are a small number of other clubs. The majority of the clubs are based in and around Glasgow, and Glasgow City Council provide funding for junior teams.

Media

There are two weekly rugby league newspapers, Rugby Leaguer & League Express and League Weekly, and two monthly magazines, Rugby League World and Thirteen Magazine. These cover the sport worldwide and across the UK. These publications are usually only available by subscription in Scotland.

BBC Sport own the rights to broadcast a highlights package called the Super League Show which was first broadcast in Scotland in 2008. Prior to this it had only been broadcast in the North of England. Rugby League Raw is not broadcast in Scotland despite the BBC owning the rights to do so. The BBC covers the Rugby League Challenge Cup from the rounds in which the top clubs enter.

BBC Radio Five Live and BBC Five Live Sports Extra carry commentary from a selection of Super League matches each week,.

Live Super League and National Rugby League games are shown on Sky Sports Arena with highlights also being shown on the channel. From the 2022 season, 10 live Super League games per season will be shown on Channel 4, the first time the league will be shown on terrestrial television. Championship games are shown on Premier Sports, with one game a week being aird.

See also

Sport in Scotland
Rugby league in the British Isles

References

External links